Stainborough is a civil parish in the Metropolitan Borough of Barnsley in South Yorkshire, England.  At the 2001 census it had a population of 399, reducing slightly to 390 at the 2011 Census.

See also
Listed buildings in Stainborough

References

External links

Civil parishes in South Yorkshire
Geography of the Metropolitan Borough of Barnsley